C'est la vie is a semi-autobiographical 1990 French drama written and directed by Diane Kurys. Like Peppermint Soda, Cocktail Molotov, and Entre Nous the plot revisits the theme of divorce and its effects. Set in the French beach resort of La Baule-les-Pins in the summer of 1958, it is mainly narrated in voice-over from the thirteen-year-old Frédérique's diary.

Plot
For their summer holiday in 1958, Frédérique aged 13 and her sister Sophie aged 8 go to the station with their mother Léna and nanny Odette. Their father Michel has decided to stay in Lyon and look after his business while the rest of the family go to La Baule-les-Pins, where they will meet up with the girls' uncle Léon, aunt Bella, and cousins. 

As they get in the train, Léna says she will follow later, since she has to go to Paris. When she does turn up, she behaves mysteriously and it becomes apparent that she has a lover in tow. Léon and Bella reluctantly accept him, though he is young, jobless, and living in a tent. He leaves to go and stay with a friend in New York, after begging Léna to get a divorce and join him.

She decides to go to Paris and find a job, for which she buys a car. Back at La Baule-les-Pins, Michel turns up and is horrified to find his wife gone and children abandoned. When Léna returns in her car, he smashes it up and the two then have a battle in front of Odette and the terrified girls, only ending when Frédérique threatens to kill herself with a shard of broken glass. 

Michel moves out to a rented room and tries to reconcile with the family. Sophie is still young enough to be daddy's girl, but Frédérique has seen too much to trust him again, while Léna is adamant that she has left him forever.

Cast
 Nathalie Baye as Léna Korski
 Richard Berry as Michel Korski
 Zabou as Bella Mandel, sister of Léna 
 Jean-Pierre Bacri as Léon Mandel, husband of Bella
 Vincent Lindon as Jean-Claude, lover of Léna
 Valeria Bruni Tedeschi as Odette, the nanny 
 Julie Bataille as Frédérique, elder daughter of Léna et Michel
 Candice Lefranc as Sophie, her sister 
 Alexis Derlon as Daniel, eldest son of Bella and Léon
 Emmanuelle Boidron as Suzanne, youngest daughter of Bella and Léon
 Maxime Boidron as René, third child of Bella and Léon
 Benjamin Sack as Titi, youngest son of Bella and Léon

References

External links

1990 films
1990s French-language films
1990 drama films
Films directed by Diane Kurys
Films scored by Philippe Sarde
Films about divorce
French drama films
1990s French films